Spencerburg is an unincorporated community in Pike County, in the U.S. state of Missouri.

History
Spencerburg was platted in 1836, taking its name from nearby Spencer Creek.  An old spelling was "Spencersburg". A post office called Spencersburg was established in 1837, and remained in operation until 1903.

References

Unincorporated communities in Pike County, Missouri
Unincorporated communities in Missouri